Kunming Zheng He Shipman Football Club is a defunct Chinese football club that participated in the China League Two. The team was based in Kunming, Yunnan.

History
The club was established in September 2017 as Yunnan Kunlu Football Club.

Ahead of the 2021 season, Yunnan Kunlu F.C. changed their name to Kunming Zheng He Shipman F.C..

The club was dissolved after 2021 season.

Name history
 2017–2020 Yunnan Kunlu F.C.  云南昆陆
 2021 Kunming Zheng He Shipman F.C.  昆明郑和船工

Results
All-time league rankings

As of the end of 2019 season.

Key
<div>

 Pld = Played
 W = Games won
 D = Games drawn
 L = Games lost
 F = Goals for
 A = Goals against
 Pts = Points
 Pos = Final position

 DNQ = Did not qualify
 DNE = Did not enter
 NH = Not Held
 WD = Withdrawal
 – = Does Not Exist
 R1 = Round 1
 R2 = Round 2
 R3 = Round 3
 R4 = Round 4

 F = Final
 SF = Semi-finals
 QF = Quarter-finals
 R16 = Round of 16
 Group = Group stage
 GS2 = Second Group stage
 QR1 = First Qualifying Round
 QR2 = Second Qualifying Round
 QR3 = Third Qualifying Round

References

External links
 Official Weibo
Soccerway

Defunct football clubs in China
Association football clubs established in 2017
Association football clubs disestablished in 2022
Sport in Yunnan
2017 establishments in China
2022 disestablishments in China